Adnan Samad Khan is a Pakistani television actor. He is best known for the portrayal of Captain Gulzar in Hum TV's Ehd-e-Wafa for which he received Lux Style Award for Best Emerging Talent.

Early life and career 

He born in Basti Gaddi, in Taunsa Sharif and he lives in Kot Addu Muzaffarnagar district, He started his showbiz career right after intermediate a graduate of NAPA, Khan started his career from theater. He did theater plays for 4 years before making his on-screen debut.

He first appeared in a supporting role in ISPR and Momina Duraid's Ehd-e-Wafa where he portrayed a military cadet of Siraki descent who later becomes a Captain. Khan received critical praise and many accolades for his performance in the series including the Lux Style Award.

Television

Accolades 

 2020 - Pakistan International Screen Awards - Best Television Actor in Comedy Role for Ehd-e-Wafa
 2021 - Lux Style Awards - Best Emerging Talent in TV for Ehd-e-Wafa

References 

Year of birth missing (living people)
Living people
Pakistani male television actors
21st-century Pakistani male actors